Myriopteris scabra, previously known as Pellaea scabra, Cheilanthes aspera or Cheilanthes horridula,  is a species of cheilanthoid fern with the common name rough lipfern. It is native to Mexico and to Texas in the United States.

Description
Myriopteris scabra grows from a short creeping rhizome, usually 4–7 mm in diameter with brown scales. The leaves (fronds) are clustered and may range greatly in size from 5–30 cm long. The leaf petiole is black to dark brown. The leaf blade is 1–4 cm wide, linear-oblong to lanceolate, and up to pinnate-pinnatifid to 2-pinnate. The rachis has scattered linear-lanceolate scales and dimorphic pubescence, abaxially sparsely hirsute, adaxially covered with tortuous appressed hairs. The ultimate leaflets are narrowly elliptic to elongate-deltate, not beadlike, and up to 3–5 mm long. The upper leaflet surface has a distinctive rough or spiky surface, which distinguishes this species from most other Myriopteris, and gives rise to the specific name scabra (Latin for rough or coarse). The leaflet edges are only folded under at their margins, barely concealing the sori (when present), which form a continuous bead around leaflet margins.

Range and habitat
Myriopteris scabra is native to northern Mexico, the Yucatan Peninsula, and to central and western Texas, extending north into Oklahoma. It grows on rocks and in rock crevices, mostly restricted to limestone, at elevations from 100 to 1400 meters. Some close relatives of Myriopteris scabra are also calcareous soil/limestone specialists, including Myriopteris alabamensis, Myriopteris aemula, and Myriopteris microphylla. These species have ranges in the southern United States, Mexico, and Caribbean islands. Interestingly, another Myriopteris limestone specialist Myriopteris gracilis is not closely related to Myriopteris scabra. M. gracilis has a range that includes high mountains in the southwest United States and extends to much colder regions including Montana, Idaho, and British Columbia.

Taxonomy
According to plastid DNA sequence analysis, Myriopteris scabra is in the alabamensis clade of Myriopteris and its closest relative is Myriopteris fimbriata.

References

Works cited

Flora of Texas
Flora of Mexico
scabra